Tijani and Tyjani is a masculine given name. Notable people with the name include:

 Tijani Babangida (born 1973), Nigerian footballer
 Tijani Belaïd (born 1987), Tunisian footballer
 Tijani Ould Kerim (born 1951), Mauritanian diplomat
 Tijani Moro (born 1978), Ghanaian boxer
 Tijani Adetoyese Olusi (born 1967), Yoruba executive chairman
 Tijani Luqman Opeyemi (born 1990), Nigerian soccer player
 Tyjani Beztami (born 1997), Dutch-Moroccan kickboxer

Masculine given names